Ischnurges is a genus of moths of the family Crambidae.

Species
Ischnurges bagoasalis Druce, 1899
Ischnurges gratiosalis (Walker, 1859)
Ischnurges illustralis Lederer, 1863
Ischnurges inusitata Gaede, 1916
Ischnurges luteomarginalis (Hampson, 1891)
Ischnurges rhodographalis Hampson, 1913

Former species
Ischnurges lancinalis (Guenée, 1854)

References

Spilomelinae
Crambidae genera
Taxa named by Julius Lederer